The Nantucket Central Railroad Company was a  narrow gauge railroad on the island of Nantucket. The railroad linked the village of Nantucket with the village of Siasconset.  Built in 1881, the line closed in 1917, with the track and rolling stock sent to France as part of the Allied forces of the First World War. Years after the railroad was discontinued, the last railroad car left on the island was converted to a popular restaurant known today as the Club Car.

Originally, the company was known as the Nantucket Railroad, but following the bankruptcy of the company in 1895 allowed for the company to reorganize under the name that it carried until 1917.

Locomotives

Notes

References 
 
Stanley, Robert C. (1980) Narrow Gauge - The Story of the Boston, Revere Beach & Lynn Railroad. Cambridge, Massachusetts: Boston Street Railway Association.

3 ft gauge railways in the United States
Defunct Massachusetts railroads
Narrow gauge railroads in Massachusetts